The Honda S660 is a two-seat targa sports car in the kei class manufactured by the Japanese manufacturer Honda with a transverse mid-engine and rear-wheel-drive layout. It is the successor to the Honda Beat (with regard to segment), and the Honda S2000 (with regard to nomenclature, as it also belongs to Honda's family of "S" models).

Overview 
The S660 is a lightweight mid-engined roadster with a targa roof. Its dimensions, due to kei car size restrictions, are nearly identical to the 1990s Beat. It is sold with either a 6-speed manual transmission or a 7-speed CVT with sports paddle shifters, both options being offered on the two trims available (Alpha and Beta). The S660 weighs approximately 830 kg with the manual transmission and 850 kg with the CVT, and have a front/rear weight balance of 45/55.

The naming convention of using the letter "S" followed by the engine displacement is a long-held Honda tradition going back to Honda's second production car, the Honda S500 (from which the S660 draws inspiration).

Performance 
The S660 is powered by the same turbocharged 658 cc S07A Turbo engine used in the N-One with some mechanical improvements.

Development and launch  

A prototype was shown at the November 2013 Tokyo Motor Show. The prototype and proposed production announcement were widely covered in auto enthusiast news sites and blogs. Initial reactions to the concept were favorable.

After the S660 entered the market, its first driving review was in June 2015 of a Japanese-market prototype driven by Top Gear in Tokyo. The author concluded that the car was "supremely maneuverable" but lacked power, something he hoped an export model with a larger motor would amend, and felt that such an export model might be a potential Mazda MX-5 competitor.

First photographs 
The prototype S660 was photographed by car enthusiasts at a wintertime car event in early 2015 and published in the Japanese car enthusiast magazine Mag-X, and subsequently republished in the US car blog The Truth About Cars. The pictures included several exterior photos and one of the opened engine compartment.

Production 
The development team of the S660 was led by Ryo Mukumoto, who beat out 400 other participants in Honda's in-house competition at the age of 22. Honda made him the youngest lead engineer in the company's history in spite of his lack of engineering experience, and he was given 5 years to develop the S660.

Discontinuation 
Production of the S660 ended in March 2022.

Gallery

References

External links 

 
 Tokyo Auto Show 2013 S660 press kit (in Japanese) pg 1, 2

S660
Cars introduced in 2015
2020s cars
Kei cars
Roadsters
Rear mid-engine, rear-wheel-drive vehicles
Vehicles with CVT transmission